Anantnag–Rajouri Lok Sabha constituency is one of the five Lok Sabha (parliamentary)  constituencies in Jammu and Kashmir  in northern India.

Assembly segments

See also
 Anantnag Lok Sabha constituency
 List of Constituencies of the Lok Sabha

References

Lok Sabha constituencies in Jammu and Kashmir
Anantnag district
Pulwama district
Shopian district
Kulgam district